Tukahur District is a district (bakhsh) in Minab County, Hormozgan Province, Iran. At the 2006 census, its population was 26,133, in 5,488 families.  The District has one city: Hasht Bandi.  The District has two rural districts (dehestan): Cheraghabad Rural District and Tukahur Rural District.

References 

Districts of Hormozgan Province
Minab County